The city of Sandersville is the county seat of Washington County, Georgia, United States. The population was 5,912 at the 2010 census. It is also a part of the Central Savannah River Area.

Sandersville is known as the "Kaolin Capital of the World" due to its abundance of kaolin.

Geography
The area is along the "Fall Line" that separates the Piedmont Plateau and the Atlantic Coastal Plain and is characterized by rolling hills, red clay, pine and hardwood forest, swamplands, and sand beds. The area tapers off from North to South and becomes more flat. Heading north it becomes more hilly with higher elevations.

Climate

Demographics

2020 census

As of the 2020 United States Census, there were 5,813 people, 2,213 households, and 1,425 families residing in the city.

2011
As of the census of 2011, there were 6,097 people, 2,315 households, and 1,568 families residing in the city. The racial makeup of the city was 59.03% African American, 39.76% White, 0.11% Native American, 0.60% Asian, 0.05% Pacific Islander, 0.03% from other races, and 0.41% from two or more races. Hispanic or Latino of any race were 0.24% of the population.

There were 2,362 households, out of which 31.8% had children under the age of 18 living with them, 37.2% were married couples living together, 25.8% had a female householder with no husband present, and 32.6% were non-families. 30.0% of all households were made up of individuals, and 13.3% had someone living alone who was 65 years of age or older.  The average household size was 2.52 and the average family size was 3.13.

In the city, the population was spread out, with 28.0% under the age of 18, 7.8% from 18 to 24, 26.5% from 25 to 44, 21.8% from 45 to 64, and 15.9% who were 65 years of age or older.  The median age was 37 years. For every 100 females, there were 79.6 males.  For every 100 females age 18 and over, there were 72.4 males.

The median income for a household in the city was $27,201, and the median income for a family was $32,462. Males had a median income of $36,089 versus $21,765 for females. The per capita income for the city was $18,226.  About 24.3% of families and 27.5% of the population were below the poverty line, including 36.2% of those under age 18 and 24.1% of those age 65 or over.

History

Established by British settlers in Creek territory in the 18th century, shortly after the American Revolution, the town of Sandersville became the county seat of Washington County in 1796. Creek leaders had not yet ceded their territory when Sandersville was settled. According to a book on Georgia place-names, the city was named after M. Saunders, a local store owner. The settlement was located at an intersection of Native American Indian trails, and later the site of Saunders' general store.

The town appears on Anthony Finley's 1827 map of Georgia.

In 1864, during the Civil War, General William T. Sherman skirmished and then paused in Sandersville during his March to the Sea. Brief resistance to the advancing Union forces was centered on the courthouse. As they left, Sherman's troops burned both it and jail, but left the rest of the town intact.  A new Washington County Courthouse was built in 1869.

The Sandersville Railroad was built in 1893 as a part of the Central of Georgia Railway, but still operates today as a private owned shortline that connects to Norfolk Southern Railway's Georgia Division Savannah District at Tennille, Georgia 4 miles to the South.

According to the U.S. National Archive, Nation of Islam leader Elijah Mohammad grew up in Sandersville in the 1890s and 1900s. He is reported to have said that, in Sandersville, he witnessed three lynchings before the age of 10.

Economy
The economy of Sandersville was based on agriculture, particularly cotton, for many years. In the 1950s, an industry developed based on the mining and processing of kaolin found in the area.

Education

Washington County School District
The Washington County School District holds pre-school to grade twelve, and consists of a primary and elementary school, a middle school, and a high school. The district has 220 full-time teachers and over 3,821 students.
Ridge Road Primary School
Ridge Road Elementary School
T. J. Elder Middle School
Washington County High School

Private education
Brentwood School (grades K-3 through 12)

Higher education
 Oconee Fall Line Technical College- Main Campus [ North Campus ] 
 Georgia Military College- Extension Centre

Sports
Sandersville was home to the minor league baseball teams, the Sandersville Giants (1955-1956) and Sandersville Wacos (1953-1954). Sandersville played in the Class D Georgia State League (GSL) from 1953 to 1956 and played at Sandersville Baseball Park. Baseball Hall of Fame inductee Willie McCovey played for the Sandersville Giants in 1955. The team folded along with the Georgia State League following the 1956 season. Sandersville was an affiliate of the Milwaukee Braves (1953) and New York Giants (1955-1956).

Newspaper
Sandersville has two newspapers: The Sandersville Progress and "The Spotlight". They both are published weekly. The Sandersville Progress began publication in 1870.

Notable people  

Nathan Deal, 82nd Governor of Georgia
Doris Duke, soul singer
Robert Edwards, professional football player
Terrence Edwards, professional football player
Thomas W. Hardwick, lawyer and 63rd Governor of Georgia
Herbert Jefferson Jr., actor
Marvin Lane, professional baseball player
Greg Minor, professional basketball player 
Elijah Muhammad, Leader of the Nation of Islam
Takeo Spikes, professional football player
Coot Veal, professional baseball player
 Allisha Gray, professional basketball player

See also

Central Savannah River Area hometown of Private Willie Duckworth Inventor of the military cadence

References

External links
Official website for the City of Sandersville
Sandersville page on Georgia.gov
Official website for the Washington County Board of Education

Cities in Georgia (U.S. state)
Cities in Washington County, Georgia
County seats in Georgia (U.S. state)